The Journal of Sol-Gel Science and Technology is a monthly peer-reviewed scientific journal covering research on sol-gel materials. Recent findings on new products developed via chemical nanotechnology are also included.

According to the Journal Citation Reports, the Journal of Sol-Gel Science and Technology has a 2021 impact factor of 2.606. It is the official journal of the International Sol-Gel Society.

Abstracting and indexing 
The journal is abstracted and indexed in:

References

External links 
 
 International Sol-Gel Society

Physics journals
Springer Science+Business Media academic journals
English-language journals
Monthly journals
Publications established in 1993
Nanotechnology journals